Captain Marcos Farfán de los Godos was a Spanish explorer who explored the modern Mexico and Arizona.

Early life
Farfán de los Godos was born in Seville, Spain.

Career
Farfán de los Godos was sent to regions north of present-day Mexico by Juan de Oñate to explore territory and look for mines. In 1598, he went to modern-day Arizona, where he was met by the Hopi people.

Farfán staked out claims on mines near present-day Jerome, Arizona.

Poet Gaspar Pérez de Villagrá mentioned Farfán in one of his poems.

References

16th-century births
People from Seville
Spanish explorers of North America
Explorers of Arizona
Year of death unknown